Ellerton FC is a Barbadian association football club based in Bridgetown that competes in the Barbados Premier League.

History
The club was founded as Ellerton City FC in 1995. The club has never won the league championship.

References

External links
Barbados FA profile
Soccerway profile

Football clubs in Barbados